Sherri Malaika Ayesha Henry (born April 12, 1982 in Castries) is a retired Saint Lucian swimmer, who specialized in sprint freestyle events. Henry became one of the first ever swimmers alongside Jamie Peterkin to represent Saint Lucia at the 2000 Summer Olympics.

Henry competed only in the women's 50 m freestyle at the 2000 Summer Olympics in Sydney. She received a ticket from FINA, under a Universality program, in an entry time of 29.99. She challenged seven other swimmers in heat three, including Nigeria's top favorite Ngozi Monu and Aruba's 15-year-old teen Roshendra Vrolijk. She posted a lifetime best and a Saint Lucian record of 28.81 to scorch the field with a quick pace for the fourth seed. Henry failed to advance into the semifinals, as she placed sixtieth overall out of 74 swimmers in the prelims.

References

External links
Athlete Profiles – Saint Lucia at the 2000 Summer Olympics (St. Lucia Online)

1982 births
Living people
Saint Lucian female swimmers
Olympic swimmers of Saint Lucia
Swimmers at the 1999 Pan American Games
Swimmers at the 2000 Summer Olympics
Pan American Games competitors for Saint Lucia
Saint Lucian female freestyle swimmers